The small town of Herbert,  formerly Otepopo, lies in North Otago, New Zealand,  north of Dunedin and  south-west of Oamaru. It lies on the edge of the Herbert Forest.

Herbert consists of a group of houses and three churches clustered around State Highway 1. A service station is also the postal agency. Two main industries operate in Herbert; an agricultural, industrial and forestry helicopter base and a poultry unit. Surrounding the settlement is rolling and fertile pastureland.
The poultry farm, Craigs Poultry, was a finalist for the 2007 Otago Ballance Farm Environment Awards.
The Main South Line also passes through Herbert, and a station existed here until its closure in 1980; only the crossing loop remains. The short 220-metre Otepopo railway tunnel is also in the vicinity.

On a north-facing site  from the town was the Otepopo School. This was a primary school for children from 5 to about 13 years old. Thereafter, the children went to Oamaru for further education. Otepopo school was closed in September 2010, due to a rapid decline in the school roll. From 22 pupils in 2009, its roll had dropped to 4 before its closure.

The New Zealand Ministry for Culture and Heritage gives a translation of "place of the decayed wood" for Ōtepopo.

Some five kilometres south of Herbert is the farming settlement of Waianakarua. The old stone bridge at Waianakarua is the oldest that is still used by the New Zealand State Highway network. This bridge was dismantled stone by stone in 2004, and rebuilt 2 metres wider. In 2005 it was reopened as part of the State Highway network again. Alongside this bridge is an early example of a flourmill (now meals and accommodation – The Mill House]) and 3 km upstream from the bridge is an historical site of another early flourmill, alongside the remains of a dam. Among Waianakarua's more well-known landmarks is "The Big Chicken", a topiary bird standing several metres tall, next to which is a Moeraki boulder "egg".

The son of Burt Munro, portrayed by Anthony Hopkins in the film "The World's Fastest Indian, resides in Waianakarua and has Burt's (now famous) motorcycle among his possessions.

Pig hunting and sea and river fishing are some of the activities available in the Herbert and Waianakarua district.

Demographics
It is part of the larger Maheno statistical area.

Herbert had a population of 96 at the 2018 New Zealand census, a decrease of 15 people (-13.5%) since the 2013 census, and a decrease of 18 people (-15.8%) since the 2006 census. There were 42 households. There were 48 males and 48 females, giving a sex ratio of 1.0 males per female. The median age was 51.1 years (compared with 37.4 years nationally), with 12 people (12.5%) aged under 15 years, 9 (9.4%) aged 15 to 29, 54 (56.2%) aged 30 to 64, and 21 (21.9%) aged 65 or older.

Ethnicities were 96.9% European/Pākehā, 9.4% Māori, and 3.1% Asian (totals add to more than 100% since people could identify with multiple ethnicities).

Although some people objected to giving their religion, 62.5% had no religion, 31.2% were Christian and 3.1% had other religions.

Of those at least 15 years old, 12 (14.3%) people had a bachelor or higher degree, and 24 (28.6%) people had no formal qualifications. The median income was $22,400, compared with $31,800 nationally. The employment status of those at least 15 was that 33 (39.3%) people were employed full-time, 15 (17.9%) were part-time, and 3 (3.6%) were unemployed.

Notable people
 

Annie Isabella James (1884–1965), Presbyterian medical missionary

References

Waitaki District
Populated places in Otago